Municipal elections are scheduled to be held in the Indian state of Punjab in 2023. The elections are scheduled for 46 urban local bodies, including 5 municipal corporations and 41 municipal councils and nagar panchayats.

Background 
Previously, elections for these local bodies were held in December 2017, where Indian National Congress won all the four Municipal Corporations.

Elections 
Delimitition of the wards started in December 2022.

References 

Punjab
Local elections in Punjab, India